Ola Isene (2 June 1898 – 6 May 1973) was a Norwegian opera singer (baritone) and actor.

Isene was born in Rødenes and studied at the Musikkonservatoriet in Kristiania.  He made his professional debut at the Mayol-teatret in 1923. His operatic roles were varied, among them Beckmesser in Die Meistersinger von Nürnberg, Scarpia in Tosca, and Amonasro in Aïda – most of them at the Nationaltheatret, which at the time had opera on its programme. He took part in many tours and also appeared in operettas, including as Schubert in  Jomfruburet. In 1929, he sang Al Jolson's parts from The Jazz Singer when it was presented as a silent film in Sweden, and in the middle of the 1930s, he moved to theatre and film as an actor.

Isene also played the title role in the three criminal radio plays Inspektør Scott på farten by John P. Wynn, which were broadcast by Norwegian Broadcasting Corporation radio in 1960 and 1961.

Ola Isene was from 1926 married to the singer and voice teacher Haldis Ingebjart Isene (1891–1978). His brother Torbjørn was a great-grandfather to discus thrower Ola Stunes Isene.

Filmography

 1931: Love and the Home Guard (Swedish)
 1932: The Southsiders (Swedish)
 1940: Tørres Snørtevold
 1942:  Trysil-Knut
 1946: Englandsfarere
 1946: Så møtes vi imorgen
 1946: Vi vil leve 
 1948: Den hemmelighetsfulle leiligheten
 1948: Trollfossen
 1952: Andrine og Kjell
 1955: Blodveien
 1957: Peter van Heeren
 1958: Høysommer
 1958: Ut av mørket
 1960: Struggle for Eagle Peak
 1960: Veien tilbake
 1961: Hans Nielsen Hauge
 1963: Vildanden
 1964: Nydelige nelliker
 1964: Alle tiders kupp
 1965: Skjær i sjøen
 1968: Sus og dus på by'n
 1970: Balladen om mestertyven Ole Høiland
 1970: Olsenbanden og Dynamitt-Harry
 1973: Knut Formos siste jakt

References

Sources
Hoemsnes, Tone, Ola Isene, Store Norsk Lekskicon (in Norwegian)

External links

1898 births
1973 deaths
Norwegian operatic baritones
20th-century Norwegian male opera singers
Norwegian male radio actors
Norwegian male film actors
Norwegian male stage actors
People from Marker, Norway
Musicians from Østfold